Orsinian Tales is a collection of eleven short stories by American writer Ursula K. Le Guin, most of them set in the imaginary country of Orsinia.

Themes
The stories share few links except those derived from the use of a common geographical setting; the only link between characters appears in the stories Brothers and Sisters and A Week in the Country, both of which deal with members of the Fabbre family (whose history is continued in the later story Unlocking the Air).  Common to all the stories, however, are emotionally moving personal events—often, though not always, romantic—set against the backdrop of much larger political events such as wars and revolutions.  Continually reasserted are the right of the individual—sometimes alone, but often in conjunction with others—to his or her own thoughts and emotions, not dictated by society, or convention, or the State.

Continuations
Additional stories in the cycle include the novel Malafrena (1979), set in the Orsinia of the 1820s; the Borges-like story "Two Delays on the Northern Line" (1979, anthologized in The Compass Rose 1982), containing two tangentially linked episodes of uncertain date; and "Unlocking the Air" (1990, anthologized in Unlocking the Air and Other Stories 1996). The last-named story extends Orsinian history to the time of the downfall of Communism in Orsinia—and the rest of Eastern Europe—in the winter of 1989.

Orsinia
The stories are set in a fictional country somewhere in Central Europe, at different times in the period 1150-1965 (though only two take place before the 20th century).  This country, "Orsinia", appears in Le Guin's earliest writings, and was invented by Le Guin when she was a young adult learning her craft as a writer.  The names Orsinia and Ursula are both derived from Latin ursus "bear" (ursula = diminutive of ursa "female bear"; ursinus = "bear-like"). Le Guin once said that since Orsinia was her own country it should bear her name.

The history of Orsinia follows, in general, that of other countries of Central Europe, particularly those formerly part of Austria-Hungary. Formerly an independent kingdom (The Lady of Moge), by the 19th century it was a dependency of the Austrian Empire (Malafrena).  It was involved in the First World War (Conversations at Night), and was thereafter independent for a while.  Its fate in World War II is not mentioned, but in 1946 or 1947 it became a satellite state in the East bloc.  A revolt was attempted in 1956 (The Road East), but was crushed and followed by reprisals (A Week in the Country), and Orsinia remained a repressive police state for several decades.  In November 1989, following a series of non-violent protests, the government fell, to be replaced by a transitional régime promising free elections (Unlocking the Air).  Le Guin did not publish any Orsinian stories dealing with its history since.

The Orsinian stories borrow episodes from, and sometimes explicitly refer to, the history of the Czech lands, Hungary, and other countries of Central Europe—for example, it is landlocked and in the 19th Century rebelled unsuccessfully against Habsburg rule.  It is not however, a mere fictionalization of any real country, but rather one imagined with its own unique characteristics and history, distilled from Le Guin's personal interpretation and reaction to historical events.

Contents 
"The Fountains"
"The Barrow" (1976, The Magazine of Fantasy & Science Fiction, October 1976)
"Ile Forest"
"Conversations At Night"
"The Road East"
"Brothers and Sisters" (1976, The Little Magazine, Vol. 10, Nos. 1 & 2)
"A Week in the Country" (1976, The Little Magazine, Vol. 9, No. 4)
"An die Musik" (1961, The Western Humanities Review, Vol XV, No. 3)
"The House"
"The Lady of Moge"
"Imaginary Countries" (1973, The Harvard Advocate)

References
Notes

Bibliography

 

Short story collections by Ursula K. Le Guin
1976 short story collections
Harper & Row books
Eastern Europe in fiction